Louis-Joseph Forget (March 11, 1853 – April 7, 1911) was a Canadian businessman and politician.

Life and career
Born in Terrebonne, Canada East, he was a stockbroker and then founded his own brokerage firm, L. J. Forget et Compagnie, in 1876. One of the wealthiest French Canadians in Montreal, he was chairman of the Montreal Stock Exchange in 1895 and 1896. He was president of the Montreal Street Railway Company and helped the company switch from horse cars to electric tramways. In 1904, he was the first French Canadian to be appointed to the board of directors of the Canadian Pacific Railway.

His nephew Rodolphe Forget joined his company and became one of the most important businessmen in the Province of Quebec and an elected member of the House of Commons of Canada.

Louis-Joseph Forget was appointed to the Senate of Canada representing the senatorial division of Sorel, Quebec in 1896. A Conservative, he served until his death.

His great-niece is Thérèse Forget Casgrain, a feminist, reformer, politician and senator. His home still survives today in Montreal's Golden Square Mile.

He died in Nice, France in 1911 and is buried in the Notre Dame des Neiges Cemetery.

References

External links 

1853 births
1911 deaths
Businesspeople from Quebec
Canadian senators from Quebec
Conservative Party of Canada (1867–1942) senators
People from Terrebonne, Quebec
Canadian stockbrokers
Burials at Notre Dame des Neiges Cemetery